Helen Morse (born 24 January 1947) is an English-born Australian actress who has appeared in films, on television and on stage. She won the AFI (AACTA) Award for Best Actress in a Leading Role for the 1976 film Caddie, and starred in the 1981 miniseries A Town Like Alice. Her other film appearances include Picnic at Hanging Rock (1975), Agatha (1979), Far East (1982) and The Eye of the Storm (2011).

Early life and education
Morse was born in Harrow on the Hill, Middlesex, England, in 1947. She was the oldest of four children; her parents were a doctor and nurse. She moved to Australia in 1950 with her family. She attended school at Presbyterian Ladies' College in Burwood, Victoria, and graduated from at the National Institute of Dramatic Art in 1965, and trained with Brian Syron in Sydney.

Career 
Morse won the Australian Film Institute Award for Best Actress in a Leading Role for her performance in the 1976 film Caddie. Her notable screen performances also include roles in the film Picnic at Hanging Rock (1975) and the television miniseries A Town Like Alice. Since her early work with Jim Sharman in the 1960s and 70s – A Taste of Honey, Terror Australis, As You Like It. Morse has worked in over ninety theatre productions. Morse had roles on many television productions, including three episodes of The Doctor Blake Mysteries in 2014 (Series 2), 2015 (Series 3), and 2016 (Series 4).

Theatre
Morse has worked with many companies including Melbourne Theatre Company, The Ensemble, The Independent, Nimrod Theatre Company, Marian Street, Sydney Theatre Company, Hunter Valley Theatre Company, Queensland Theatre Company, Harvest Theatre Company (South Australia) and the State Theatre Company of South Australia.

In 2002 and again in 2008, Morse played the role of Theodora Goodman in Adam Cook's adaptation of Patrick White's The Aunt's Story. Her 2004 performance as Nancy in Bryony Lavery's Frozen for the Melbourne Theatre Company earned her a Helpmann Award for Best Female Actor in a Play nomination. She has since been nominated for productions of John by Annie Baker (Melbourne Theatre Company), and Memorial by Alice Oswald (Brink Productions). In 2020, she won a Green Room Award for her performance in 33 Variations by Moises Kaufman (Cameron Lukey and Neil Gooding Productions).

Other theatre credits include
 Terror Australis
 A Taste of Honey
 The Woman in the Window by Alma De Groen
 Stephen Sondheim's A Little Night Music
 Stephanie Abrahams in Duet for One
 Blanche DuBois in A Streetcar Named Desire
 Title role in Hedda Gabler
 Katherine Mansfield in The Rivers of China
 Barbara in Europe by Michael Gow
 Carlotta in The Cherry Orchard
 Ariel in The Tempest
 Lizzie Morden in Our Country's Good
 Elizabeth Proctor in The Crucible
 Hannah in Arcadia by Tom Stoppard
 Away by Michael Gow
 Good Works by Nick Enright
 The Twilight Series FED/FEST
 Death and the Maiden with Sydney Theatre Company
 The Funniest Man in the World with Keene/Taylor Theatre Projects
 Kaddish with Keene/Taylor Theatre Projects
 Sundowner by Kate and David Denborough, 2013 national tour
 Once in Royal David's City by Michael Gow, 2014 Belvoir
 Angels in America by Tony Kushner, 2017 staged at Fortyfivedownstairs theatre in Melbourne
 33 Variations by Moises Kaufman, 2020 Comedy Theatre Melbourne

Filmography

{|class="wikitable"
|+Television
|-
! Year
! Title
! Role
! Type
|-
| 1966
| Twelfth Night
| Olivia
| ABC Teleplay
|-
| 1966
| The Runaway
| Jenny
| ABC Teleplay
|-
| 1966; 1967
| Australian Playhouse
| Beatrice / Patty Hutton
| TV series, 2 episodes "No Dogs On Diamond Street" / "Sailor's Trousers"
|-
| 1967
| The Queen's Bishop
| unknown
| ABC Teleplay
|-
| 1967–1972
| Homicide
| Stella Lee / Joanne Edwards / Pamela Chandler
| TV series, 3 episodes
|-
| 1967
| You Can't See 'Round Corners
| Karen
| TV series, 1 episode
|-
| 1967
| Contrabandits
| Angela Carrol
| TV series, 1 episode
|-
| 1968
| The Great Barrier Reef
| Narrator
| Film documentary
|-
| 1969
| Love and War – Intersection
| unknown
| ABC Teleplay
|-
| 1969–1974
| Division 4
| Mrs. Kirby / Angela Hughes / Penny Horton / Chrsitine Marriott / Tina Findlay / Angela McGregor
| TV series, 6 episodes
|-
| 1969
| Riptide
| Joanna Decker
| TV series, 1 episode
|-
| 1969
| The Pressure Pak Show
| Herself – Guest
| TV series, 1 episode
|-
| 1970
| A Connecticut Yankee In King Arthur's Court
| (Voice) (as H. Morse)
| Animated TV movie
|-
| 1970
| Barrier Reef
| Joan Norris
| TV series, 1 episode
|-
| 1971
| The Legend Of Robin Hood
| (Voice)
| Animated TV movie
|-
| 1971
| Spyforce
| Joan / Nurse
| TV series, 2 episodes "The Escape"
|-
| 1972
| The Spoiler
| unknown
| TV series, 1 episode
|-
| 1972
| Travels of Marco Polo
| Princess Cocacin (voice)
| Animated TV movie
|-
| 1972
| Crisis
| Margie
| TV pilot
|-
| 1972
| The Resistible Rise of Arturo Ui
| Dockdaisy
| ABC Teleplay
|-
| 1972
| Matlock Police
| Susan Williams
| TV series, 1 episode
|-
| 1972
| Quartet
| unknown
| TV series, 1 episode "The Last Great Journey"
|-
| 1972
| The Kenneth Connor Show
| Various characters
| TV series, 4 episodes
|-
| 1973; 1974
| Ryan
| Shirley Green / Goldie Taylor
| TV series, 2 episodes
|-
| 1974
| Things that Go Bump in the Night
| Kalie Ingham
| TV series, 1 episode
|-
| 1974
| Marion
| Marion Richards
| ABC TV miniseries, 4 episodes
|-
| 1974
| This Love Affair
| role unknown
| ABC TV series, 1 episode 11: "A Family Christmas"
|-
| 1974
| A Touch of Reverence
| unknown
| ABC TV miniseries
|-
| 1975
| Ivanhoe
| (Voice)
| Animated TV movie
|-
| 1976
| Luke's Kingdom
| Kate
| TV miniseries, 13 episodes
|-
| 1976
| Power Without Glory
| unknown
| ABC TV miniseries
|-
| 1976
| Obsession – Kill Kaplan!
| unknown
| ABC Teleplay
|-
| 1979
| The Sullivans
| unknown
| TV series
|-
| 1981
| A Town Like Alice
| Jean Paget
| TV miniseries, 3 episodes
|-
| 1982
| Logie Awards of 1982
| Herself
| TV special
|-
| 1982
| Silent Reach
| Antonia Russell
| TV miniseries, 2 episodes
|-
| 1982
| Parkinson in Australia
| Herself – Guest & Bryan Brown
| TV series, 1 episode
|-
| 1983
| Australian Movies To The World
| Herself
| TV special
|-
| 1985
| Sherlock Holmes and the Baskerville Curse
| Beryl Stapleton (voice)
| Animated TV movie, UK
|-
| 1985
| The Adventures of Robin Hood
| Maid Marion (voice)
| Animated TV movie
|-
| 1991
| In Sydney Today
| Herself – Guest
| TV series, 1 episode
|-
| 1992
| Bony
| unknown
| TV series, 1 episode
|-
| 1993
| Review
| Herself – Guest presenter
| ABC TV series, 1 episode
|-
| 1995;1997
| Good Morning Australia
| Herself – Guest
| TV series, 2 episodes
|-
| 1997
| Night of the Bogongs
| Narrator
| ABC TV documentary
|-
| 1999
| Stone Forever
| Herself
| SBS TV special
|-
| 2000
| Pozières
| Herself
| TV movie Documentary
|-
| 2002
| Caddie on Location
| Herself
| Video film documentary
|-
| 2003
| Love Letters from a War
| Narrator
| TV movie
|-
| 2004
| A Dream within a Dream: The Making of 'Picnic at Hanging Rock'''
| Herself
| Video film documentary
|-
| 2008
| The Prime Minister Is Missing| Narrator
| TV documentary
|-
| 2010
| City Homicide| Penelope McVeigh
| TV series, 1 episode
|-
| 2010
| Mary McKillop: Soul Of The Sunburnt Country| Mary McKillop (voice)
| Video documentary
|-
| 2012
| The Mystery of a Hansom Cab| Mother Guttersnipe
| ABC TV movie
|-
| 2014,2016
| The Doctor Blake Mysteries| Agnes Clasby
| ABC TV series, 3 episodes
|-
| 2014
| Picnic At Hanging Rock: Everything Begins And Ends| Herself
| Video Film documentary
|-
| 2016
| Molly| Grandmother
| TV miniseries, 2 episodes
|-
| 2016
| Barracuda| Margot Taylor
| ABC TV miniseries, 2 episodes
|}

Personal life
Morse was married from 1967 until 1976 to Australian actor and director Sandy Harbutt, with whom she starred in Stone''.

References

External links
 
 
 Helen Morse at the National Film and Sound Archive

Living people
1947 births
Australian film actresses
Australian stage actresses
Australian television actresses
English emigrants to Australia
Best Actress AACTA Award winners
Logie Award winners
National Institute of Dramatic Art alumni
People from Harrow on the Hill
People educated at the Presbyterian Ladies' College, Melbourne